is a former Japanese rugby union player who played as a flanker. He played for both Suntory Sungoliath and Hino Red Dolphins in Japan's domestic Top League, playing over 100 times. He was named in the Japan squad for the 2007 Rugby World Cup, making 1 appearances in the tournament. He made a further 12 appearances for Japan in his career, scoring four tries.

References

External links
itsrugby.co.uk profile

1983 births
Living people
Japanese rugby union players
Rugby union flankers
Tokyo Sungoliath players